Pierangelo is a masculine Italian given name. Notable people with the name include:

Pierangelo Bertoli (1942–2002), Italian singer-songwriter and poet
Pierangelo Belli (born 1944), Italian footballer
Pierangelo Congiu (born 1951), Italian sprint canoeist
Pierangelo Garegnani (1930–2011), Italian economist and academic

Italian masculine given names